Rev. Fr. Gaetano Batanyenda (born 30 June 1944 in Kanungu, Uganda) is a Ugandan religious leader and one of the longest serving church leaders in Kabale diocese. He is currently serving his 25th year at Kitanga Catholic Parish. Batanyenda is the head of Kigezi Inter Religious Council as well as the head of Clergy Kitanga Parish and the head of Clergy Kabale Diocese.

Batanyenda is also active in politics, serving in the Constituent Assembly during 1994−95. In 2011, he published a letter urging president Yoweri Museveni to resign.

References

20th-century Ugandan Roman Catholic priests
Living people
1944 births
People from Kanungu District
21st-century Ugandan Roman Catholic priests